Bleil or BLEIL may refer to:
 Bilateral lower extremity inflammatory lymphedema (BLEIL), clinical entity
 Bill Bleil (born 1959), American football coach
 Fred Bleil, American football coach